WHO Expert Committee on Biological Standardization is a functioning body of World Health Organization. The Expert Committee has been meeting annually since 1947.

Reports
The Committee reports are published as WHO Technical Report Series. All the reports are available online.
 Third Report published as Technical Report Series No. 2 in 1950.
 Third Report of the Subcommittee on the Fat-Soluble Vitamins published as Technical Report Series No. 3 in 1950.
 Fifth Report published as Technical Report Series No. 56 in 1952.
 Sixth Report published as Technical Report Series No. 68 in 1953.
 Seventh Report published as Technical Report Series No. 86 in 1954.
 Eighth Report published as Technical Report Series No. 96 in 1955.
 Ninth Report published as Technical Report Series No. 108 in 1956.
 Tenth Report published as Technical Report Series No. 127 in 1957.
 Eleventh Report published as Technical Report Series No. 147 in 1958.
 Twelfth Report published as Technical Report Series No. 172 in 1959.
 Thirteenth Report published as Technical Report Series No. 187 in 1960.
 Fourteenth Report published as Technical Report Series No. 222 in 1961.
 Fifteenth Report published as Technical Report Series No. 259 in 1963.
 Sixteenth Report published as Technical Report Series No. 274 in 1964.
 Seventeenth Report published as Technical Report Series No. 293 in 1964.
 Eighteenth Report published as Technical Report Series No. 329 in 1966.
 Nineteenth Report published as Technical Report Series No. 361 in 1967.
 Twentieth Report published as Technical Report Series No. 384 in 1968.
 Twenty first Report published as Technical Report Series No. 413 in 1969.
 Twenty second Report published as Technical Report Series No. 444 in 1970.
 Twenty third Report published as Technical Report Series No. 463 in 1971.
 Twenty fourth Report published as Technical Report Series No. 486 in 1972.
 Twenty fifth Report published as Technical Report Series No. 530 in 1973.
 Twenty sixth Report published as Technical Report Series No. 565 in 1975.
 Twenty seventh Report published as Technical Report Series No. 594.
 Twenty eighth Report published as Technical Report Series No. 610.
 Twenty ninth Report published as Technical Report Series No. 626.
 Thirtieth Report published as Technical Report Series No. 638.
 Thirty first Report published as Technical Report Series No. 658.
 Thirty second Report published as Technical Report Series No. 673.
 Thirty third Report published as Technical Report Series No. 687.
 Thirty fourth Report published as Technical Report Series No. 700.
 Thirty fifth Report published as Technical Report Series No. 725.
 Thirty sixth Report published as Technical Report Series No. 745.
 Thirty seventh Report published as Technical Report Series No. 760.
 Thirty eighth Report published as Technical Report Series No. 771.
 Thirty ninth Report published as Technical Report Series No. 786.
 Fortieth Report published as Technical Report Series No. 800.
 Forty first Report published as Technical Report Series No. 814.
 Forty second Report published as Technical Report Series No. 822.
 Forty third Report published as Technical Report Series No. 840.
 Forty fourth Report published as Technical Report Series No. 848.
 Forty fifth Report published as Technical Report Series No. 858.
 Forty sixth Report published as Technical Report Series No. 872 in 1998.
 Forty seventh Report published as Technical Report Series No. 878 in 1998.
 Forty eighth Report published as Technical Report Series No. 889.
 Forty ninth Report published as Technical Report Series No. 897.
 Fiftieth Report published as Technical Report Series No. 904.
 Fifty first Report published as Technical Report Series No. 910.
 Fifty second Report published as Technical Report Series No. 924.
 Fifty third Report published as Technical Report Series No. 926.
 Fifty fourth Report published as Technical Report Series No. 927.
 Fifty fifth Report published as Technical Report Series No. 932.
 Fifty sixth Report published as Technical Report Series No. 941.

References

External links
 Expert Committee on Biologicals.

World Health Organization
Biology organizations